The Princeton Tigers women's ice hockey team represents Princeton University in the ECAC Hockey conference in the NCAA Division I women's ice hockey. They play at the Hobey Baker Memorial Rink. In the 2019-2020 season, they won their first ECAC championship, defeating #1 ranked Cornell by a score of 3-2 in overtime.

History
On November 24, 1979, the Princeton Tigers played their first varsity game against the University of Pennsylvania. In winter of 1982, Princeton would snap the Cornell Big Red women's ice hockey program's string of six straight Ivy League titles and go on to win Ivy League championships in 1983 and 1984 under head coach Bill Quackenbush.

Former Princeton player and assistant coach Laura Halldorson would coach the Minnesota Golden Gophers women's ice hockey program to the 2004 NCAA title.

On February 26, 2010, Princeton would be part of NCAA ice hockey history. With a 5-1 loss to the Harvard Crimson women's ice hockey program, Harvard coach Katey Stone became women's college hockey's all-time winningest coach, surpassing former Princeton player and Minnesota head coach Laura Halldorson.

On December 31, 2010, Rachel Weber made 24 saves as the Tigers upset the fifth ranked Boston College Eagles by a 3-0 margin. It was Weber's third shutout in four games and her goals against average for the season was lowered to 1.93 In three games played between January 3 and 8, 2011, Rachel Weber earned three victories and allowed only one goal. On January 3, she defeated Quinnipiac by a 3-0 tally and shutout Clarkson by a 2-0 score on January 7. The following day, she gave up her only goal of the week in a 3-1 win over St. Lawrence. Her shutout streak spanned six games and lasted 289:43. She is now the owner of the longest shutout streak in ECAC history and the fourth longest in NCAA Division I since the 2000-01 season.

2019-2020 was a historic season for the Tigers. The team finished with a program-best 26 wins.  Ranked 6th and seeded second, they played in and won the ECAC championship tournament for the first time. Carly Bullock scored 30 goals, only the fifth player in program history to accomplish the feat. She was named the national Player of the Month in February 2020 for scoring 13 goals in 9 games. Her 30th goal came in the ECAC championship game against Cornell, when she evened the score at 2-2. The Tigers would go on to win in overtime, 3-2, with Mariah Koepple scoring the winning goal, from assists by Shannon Griffin and Sharon Frankel.  Forward Sarah Fillier was selected as ECAC tournament Most Outstanding Player, after earning points in every game. The Tigers arrived in the championship game after beating Clarkson by a score of 5-1. The Tigers were scheduled to play Northeastern in the quarterfinals for the NCAA tournament when the event was canceled due to the COVID-19 pandemic.

Additionally, the impact of the pandemic would wipe out the 2020-21 season for all Ivy League teams. Although the ECAC Conference, the member conference for Ivy League women's ice hockey teams, held a season in 2020-21, Princeton, and all other Ivy League teams did not participate.

Year by year

Current roster
As of September 7, 2022.

Notable players
Patty Kazmaier
Denna Laing
Kelsey Koelzer

Awards and honors
 Amy Bourbeau, 2011 AHCA Assistant Coach Award (inaugural winner)
Carly Bullock, Women's Hockey Commissioners Association Player of the Month February 2020
Maggie Connors: Women’s Hockey Commissioners Association Rookie of the Month - February 2019
 Danielle DiCesare, Forward, Sophomore, 2010 Honorable Mention All-Ivy
Sarah Fillier, 2019–20 CCM Hockey Women's Division I All-American: Second Team
Sarah Fillier, 2019–20 Women's Hockey Commissioners Association National Rookie of the Year
 Patty Kazmaier, All-Ivy League Honorable Mention honors as a freshman
 Patty Kazmaier, All-Ivy League Second Team in her sophomore and junior seasons
 Patty Kazmaier, All-Ivy League First Team and All-Eastern College Athletic Conference First Team as a senior
 Patty Kazmaier, Ivy League Most Valuable Player (1986)
 Mollie Marcoux, four-time All-Ivy (1988, 1989, 1990, 1991)
 Kristen Young, ECAC Goalie of the Week (Oct 3, 2006) (Oct 22, 2007) (Nov 12, 2007) (Jan 7, 2009) (Feb 16, 2009)
 Kristen Young, Defensive Player of the Week by U.S. College Hockey Online (Nov 13, 2007)
 Marykate Oakley, Second Team All-Ivy League, 2007–08, Forward, Princeton (Senior)
 Paula Romanchuk, Forward, Sophomore, 2010 Honorable Mention All-Ivy
Sasha Sherry, Second Team All-ECAC, 2010–11
Rachel Weber, Princeton, MLX Skates Defensive Player of the Week (Week of January 4, 2011)
Rachel Weber, Princeton, MLX Skates Defensive Player of the Week (Week of January 11, 2011)
Rachel Weber, Second Team All-ECAC, 2010–11

All-Ivy honors
 Sasha Sherry, 2010–11 Second Team All-Ivy
 Rachel Weber, 2010–11 Second Team All-Ivy
 Kristen Young, Honorable Mention All-Ivy League, 2007–08, Goaltender, Princeton (Junior) 
 Kristen Young, Second Team All-Ivy, 2008–09, Goaltender, Princeton (Senior)
 Carly Bullock, 2017-18 First Team All-Ivy
 Karlie Lund, 2017-18 Second Team All-Ivy
 Claire Thompson, 2017-18 Second Team All-Ivy
 Stephanie Sucharda, 2017-18 Second Team All-Ivy
 Stephanie Neatby, 2017-18 Second Team All-Ivy

ECAC honors
 Gretchen Anderson, Forward, 2002 All-ECAC North Honorable Mention
 Katherine Dineen, First Team All-Ivy League, 2007–08, Defenseman, Princeton (Junior)
 Katherine Dineen, Defense, 2009 First Team All-ECAC
 Katherine Dineen, 2009 ECAC Best Defenseman
 Aviva Grumet-Morris, Defense,  2002 ECAC North First Team
 Jeff Kampersal: 2002 ECAC North Coach of the Year
 Jeff Kampersal, 2009 ECAC Coach of the Year
 Katharine Maglione, Defense,  2002 ECAC North All-Rookie Team
 Mollie Marcoux, All ECAC in 1991
 Mollie Marcoux, All-ECAC team of the decade (1990 ‘s)
 Mollie Marcoux, Ivy League's Silver Anniversary ice hockey team (selected in 1999).
 Sasha Sherry, First Team All-Ivy League, 2007-08, Defenseman, Princeton (Freshman)
 Sasha Sherry Defense, 2009 First Team All-ECAC
 Sasha Sherry, Defense, Junior, 2010 Second Team All-Ivy

Prinecton's Patty Kazmaier Award
Of note, the Tigers also have their own Patty Kazmaier Award. Unlike the NCAA award, this award is given annually to a senior member of the women's hockey team. The criteria includes making the greatest contribution to the program during her career and best exemplifying characteristics such as: loyalty and devotion to Princeton Women's Hockey and determination and perseverance under adverse conditions

Tigers in professional hockey

See also
Princeton Tigers men's ice hockey
Princeton Tigers

References

External links

 
Ice hockey teams in New Jersey